Haft-e-Tir Metro Station, meaning 7th of Month of Tir is a station of Mashhad Metro Line 1. The station opened on 10 October 2011. It is located on Vakilabad Expressway.

References

Mashhad Metro stations
Railway stations opened in 2011
2011 establishments in Iran